Helastia semisignata is a moth of the family Geometridae. This species is endemic to New Zealand and is only found in the North Island. The life history of this species is in need of further investigation as sources differ about what plants host the larvae. Adults are on the wing commonly from October until March.

Taxonomy 
It was first described by Francis Walker in 1862 using specimens collected by A. Sinclair in Auckland and originally named Larentia semisignata. In 1877 Arthur Gardiner Butler synonymised Cidaria dissociate and Cidaria semisilata with L. semisignata. In the same publication Butler also mistakenly synonymised Larentia corcularia with L. semisignata. This taxonomic error was correct by R. C. Craw in 1987. In 1912 L. B. Prout placed this species in the genus Xanthorhoe. This placement was followed by George Hudson in his 1928 book The butterflies and moths of New Zealand. Subsequently, in 1971, J. S. Dugdale placed this species in the genus Helastia. R. C. Craw confirmed this placement in his revision of the genus in 1987. The male holotype is held at the Natural History Museum, London.

Description 

Walker described this species as follows:
Species in the genus Helastia can be difficult to distinguish from one another. However this species normally has orange scaling present on its forewings and its wing veins have black and white patches.

Distribution
This species is endemic to New Zealand. It is found in the North Island only.

Habitat 
H. semisignata can be found in a variety of habitats at a variety of altitudes including native forest and scrubland, subalpine herbfields and in coastal areas. This species also inhabits developed areas such as parks and gardens.

Behaviour
Adults are on the wing from most frequently from October until March and are attracted to light. They are nocturnal with adults resting on trees or stones during the day.

Host plants 

Larvae of this species have been raised on mosses. But other sources state that larvae have been reared on Pimelea foliage or that they feed on herbs. These inconsistencies have resulted in Robert Hoare stating that further investigations into the life history of this species is needed. The adult moths have been observed visiting and likely feeding from the flowers of Hoheria lyallii, Olearia virgata andVeronica salicifolia.

References

Moths of New Zealand
Endemic fauna of New Zealand
Moths described in 1862
Taxa named by Francis Walker (entomologist)
Cidariini
Endemic moths of New Zealand